Carl Christian Folin (born 9 February 1991) is a Swedish professional ice hockey defenceman for Frölunda HC of the Swedish Hockey League (SHL). He previously played for the Minnesota Wild, Los Angeles Kings, Philadelphia Flyers and Montreal Canadiens in the National Hockey League (NHL).

Playing career
Folin scored six goals and 14 assists in 41 games during the 2013–14 season with the UMass Lowell River Hawks.

On 1 April 2014, the Minnesota Wild of the National Hockey League (NHL) signed Folin as an undrafted free agent to a two-year, entry-level contract,. He made his NHL debut on 10 April 2014, notching an assist for the Wild in a 4–2 win over the St. Louis Blues.

On 1 July 2017, Folin left the Wild as a free agent, opting to sign a one-year, $850,000 contract with the Los Angeles Kings. In the 2017–18 season, Folin played on the blueline in a third pairing role with the Kings. He notched a season-best of 3 goals and 13 points in 65 games.

On 5 July 2018, Folin signed as a free agent to a one-year, $800,000 contract with the Philadelphia Flyers. Opening the 2018–19 season on the Flyers roster, Folin continued to play in a bottom pairing role appearing in 26 games with Philadelphia, recording two assists, before he was traded with Dale Weise to the Montreal Canadiens in exchange for David Schlemko and Byron Froese on 10 February 2019. On 18 April, he signed a one-year contract extension with the Canadiens. Folin was waived by the Canadiens on 5 January 2020 and was reassigned to the Laval Rocket. Upon his recall to the Canadiens on 4 February 2020, Folin scored a goal in a 5-4 shootout victory.

As a free agent after seven years in the NHL, Folin opted to return to his native Sweden after securing a contract for the remainder of the 2020–21 season with the Växjö Lakers of the SHL on 30 December 2020.

Career statistics

Regular season and playoffs

International

Awards and honors

References

External links

 

1991 births
Living people
Swedish expatriate ice hockey players in Canada
Swedish expatriate ice hockey players in the United States
Fargo Force players
Frölunda HC players
Iowa Wild players
Laval Rocket players
Los Angeles Kings players
Minnesota Wild players
Montreal Canadiens players
Philadelphia Flyers players
Swedish ice hockey defencemen
UMass Lowell River Hawks men's ice hockey players
Undrafted National Hockey League players
Växjö Lakers players
Ice hockey players at the 2022 Winter Olympics
Olympic ice hockey players of Sweden